Horace Edwin Gager (25 January 1917 – March 1984) was an English professional footballer who made over 250 appearances as a centre half in the Football League for Nottingham Forest and captained the club. He also played for Luton Town and represented the Irish League XI.

Career statistics

References 

English Football League players
Spennymoor United F.C. players
Fulham F.C. players
1917 births
1984 deaths
Footballers from West Ham
Luton Town F.C. players
Glentoran F.C. players
Nottingham Forest F.C. players
Irish League representative players
English footballers
Association football wing halves